National roads (literally: road of the rike/realm) in Sweden have road numbers from 1 through 99. The national roads are usually of high quality and sometimes pass through several counties. Roads with lower numbers are in southern Sweden, and roads with higher numbers are in northern Sweden. There are many cases where two or more routes in this system share the same physical road for a considerable distance, giving the country several kilometers of double-numbered road. 

The network of national roads covers all of Sweden. The only county that does not have a riksväg is Gotland County. On Gotland and the adjacent island of Öland, the main roads are instead known as county road (länsväg). The national roads are public roads owned by the Government of Sweden and administered by the Swedish Transport Administration. They get a high priority for snow plowing during the winter.

The roads' number signs are rectangular with a blue background, white numbers, and a white border.

Current Swedish national roads
As of 2017, Sweden has 57 national roads.

Swedish national roads that have changed designation over the years
10, Trelleborg – Brösarp — current National road 9
12, Malmö – Simrishamn — current National road 11
15, Malmö – Norrköping — current European route E22, reassigned to a different route
16, Dalby – Flädie – current County road 102 and E6.02 (not signposted)
20, Ystad – Broby — current National road 19
45, Gothenburg – Karesuando — current European route E45
48, Slättäng – Mariestad — current National road 26
60, Örebro – Falun — current National road 50
64, Hassle – Mora — current National road 26
65, Västerås – Ludvika — current National road 66
71, Borlänge – Norwegian border (Stöa) — current European route E16 and National road 66
80, Gävle – Rättvik — current European route E16 and National road 69
81, Mora – Östersund — current European route E45
82, Söderhamn – Voxna — current National road 50 and County road 301
88, Östersund – Karesuando — current European route E45
93, Umeå – Storuman — current European route E12
98, Luleå – Kiruna — current European route E10, reassigned to a different route
99, Sangis – Hedenäset — current County road 398, reassigned to a different route

The classic Swedish national roads
These are the Swedish national roads that existed before the large restructuring that happened when the European routes were implemented in 1962 in Sweden.
Road 1, Riksettan, Helsingborg – Stockholm — current European route E4
Road 2, Rikstvåan, Trelleborg – Svinesund bridge — current European route E6
Road 3, Rikstrean, Connection road between riksettan and rikstvåan outside Helsingborg, Kropp – Hasslarp – Strövelstorp
Road 4, Riksfyran, Malmö – Norrköping — current European route E22
Road 5, Riksfemman, Gothenburg – Jönköping — current National road 40
Road 6, Rikssexan, Gothenburg – Örebro – Södertälje – Stockholm — current European route E20
Road 7, Rikssjuan, Gothenburg – Grums — current European route E45
Road 8, Riksåttan, Ödeshög – Hallsberg — current National road 50
Road 9, Riksnian, Norwegian border – Karlskoga — current European route E18
Road 10, Rikstian, Örebro – Gävle — current National road 50 and European route E16
Road 11, Rikselvan, Arboga – Enköping — current European route E18
Road 12, Rikstolvan, Solna – Mora — current E18 and National road 70
Road 13, Rikstretton, Stockholm – Haparanda — current European route E4
Road 14, Riksfjorton, Sundsvall – Norwegian border — current European route E14

See also
Swedish county road (Länsväg)
Norwegian national road

References

External links
Trafikverket — Swedish Transport Administration